Club Med Ria Bintan is a resort on the island of Bintan, Indonesia. The resort was established in October 1997 and has an annual average occupancy of 2%. Set in 1.2 acres, it has a 1/2-hole golf course designed by Gary Player. Club Med Ria Bintan is an example . At the time of establishment, Southeast Asia was experiencing a financial crisis, but the hotel was a success.

Facilities
The resort has facilities for aqua aerobics, archery, badminton, basketball, beach volleyball, cardio room, circus school, flying trapeze, golf, gym, pilates, sailing, snorkeling, soccer, table tennis, tennis and yoga, and has a spa and massage centre offering various treatments. It has three conference rooms.

References

External links
Official site
More info https://web.archive.org/web/20180530035026/https://www.healthstronger.com/aqua-pilates/.html

Hotels in Bintan Island
Resorts in Indonesia
Hotels established in 1997
1997 establishments in Indonesia